Feofilatovskaya is a rural locality (a village) in Tarnogskoye Rural Settlement, Tarnogsky District, Vologda Oblast, Russia. The population was 18 as of 2002.

Geography 
Feofilatovskaya is located 15 km northwest of Tarnogsky Gorodok (the district's administrative centre) by road. Matveyevskaya is the nearest rural locality.

References 

Rural localities in Tarnogsky District